Pelargonium elegans is a species of flowering plants in the family Geraniaceae.

Taxonomy
Pelargonium elegans is included in section Campylia of subgenus Pelargonium.

Description
The bloom's petals are pale pink to nearly white, with dark purple vertical lines on the two upper petals.

Distribution
The plant is endemic to South Africa. It is found in Eastern Cape and Western Cape provinces, from Hermanus to Stilbaai, and from Port Elizabeth to Grahamstown.

Its major habitats are coastal Fynbos.

Conservation
Because this species has lost coastal lowland subpopulations to urban development and competition from invasive species of plants, it is a Red List of South African Plants Least concern species. As of 2017, it is widespread over an estimated , and is extant at more than 20 locations, but the population trend is decreasing.

Cultivation
Pelargonium elegans is cultivated as an ornamental plant. It is an easy to grow plant in cultivation and can be grown outdoors if conditions are not freezing. As its natural habitat is dunes it is best suited for sandy soil.

References

External links
 
 
 SANBI/PlantZAfrica.com Pelargonium elegans 
 Red List of South African Plants: Pelargonium elegans

elegans
Endemic flora of South Africa
Flora of the Cape Provinces
Fynbos
Garden plants of Southern Africa
Least concern biota of Africa
Plants described in 1800
Taxa named by Carl Ludwig Willdenow
Taxa named by Henry Cranke Andrews